N-Succinimidyl 4-fluorobenzoate (SFB) is an organofluorine compound. When incorporating a fluorine-18 atom, SFB is used to label proteins or peptides for positron emission tomography.

References

Fluoroarenes
Benzoate esters
Imides